Mundi Mundi Station is a pastoral lease that operates as a sheep station in New South Wales.

Mundi Mundi is one of the four original stations in the Barrier Range settled through the early 1870s along with Mount Gipps, Corona and Alberta Stations. The Whittings were running sheep but also were raising horses. The family were the first Europeans to settle in the Barrier Range and their daughter, Tryphena, was the first European to be born in the area.

John Lewis had cattle stolen from the property in 1901. Lewis still owned the property in 1906 when he and other pastoralists in the area formed the Pastoralists' Association of West Darling. Lewis had also once owned other runs such as Nilpena, Wirrealpa and Nelyambo.

In 1930 the property was carrying 12,000 sheep.

Following a drought in 1943 the station manager, J. D. Kelly, sold off 7,100 sheep from the property leaving a flock of 9,000.

The 1999 Jimeoin film The Craic is set in Mundi Mundi, although the "Mundi Mundi Pub" is actually the nearby Silverton Hotel. In addition, at the beginning of Mad Max 2 (a movie set in a post-apocalyptic world) - a sign with "Mundi Mundi Lookout" can be seen as Max collects petrol.

See also
List of ranches and stations
List of reduplicated Australian place names

References

Pastoral leases in New South Wales
Stations (Australian agriculture)